Tattapani village is located in Karsog, Mandi district at a distance of 52 km from Shimla and 29 km from Naldehra. It is situated on the right bank of river Satluj at an altitude of 2,230 ft. above the sea level.

It is known for its hot water springs.

References

Villages in Mandi district